The 1977–78 Irish Cup was the 98th edition of Northern Ireland's premier football knock-out cup competition. It began on 4 February 1978, and concluded on 29 April 1978 with the final.

The defending champions were Coleraine, after they defeated Linfield 4–1 in the 1976–77 final. However, Linfield gained revenge by knocking the holders out with a 2–1 win in the first round. Linfield went on to win the cup for the 31st time, defeating Ballymena United 3–1 in the final.

Results

First round

|}

1This tie required a replay, after the first game was a 2–2 draw.

Quarter-finals

|}

Semi-finals

|}

2This tie was eventually decided by a penalty shoot-out in the second replay, after all three games ended as 1–1 draws.

Final

References

Irish Cup seasons
2
Northern Ireland